Mount Fuller is a peak in the Cathedral Rocks, Royal Society Range, rising to  between the lower portions of Zoller Glacier and Darkowski Glacier in Victoria Land, Antarctica. It was named in 1992 by the Advisory Committee on Antarctic Names in association with Chaplains Tableland after Lieutenant Commander William C. Fuller, U.S. Navy, chaplain with the 1964 winter party at McMurdo Station.

References

Mountains of Victoria Land
Scott Coast